Mahuakhera Ganj is a City, a Nagar Palika Parishad in Udham Singh Nagar district in the Indian state of Uttarakhand. The Mahuakhera Ganj city is divided into 9 wards for which elections are held every 5 years.

Geography

Demographics
 India census, Mahuakhera Ganj Nagar Palika Parishad has population of 12,584 of which 6,877 are males while 5,707 are females according to the 2011 census.

Population of Children with age of 0-6 is 1948 which is 15.48% of total population of Mahuakhera ganj (NPP). In Mahuakhera Ganj Nagar Palika Parishad, Female Sex Ratio is of 830 against state average of 963. Moreover Child Sex Ratio in Mahua Kheraganj is around 925 compared to Uttarakhand state average of 890. Literacy rate of Mahuakhera Ganj city is 65.36% lower than state average of 78.82%. In Mahuakhera Ganj, Male literacy is around 77.92% while female literacy rate is 49.93%.

References

Cities and towns in Udham Singh Nagar district